The Women competition at the IBSF World Championships 2020 was held on 28 and 29 February 2020.

Results
The first two runs were held on 28 February at 09:34. The last two runs were started on 29 February at 09:34.

References

Women